Gavin Christie (born 6 August 1981) is a Bahamian international soccer player, who plays as a defender for Cavalier FC and the Bahamas national team. He also plays beach soccer.

Club career
Christie played US college soccer for Charleston Golden Eagles and semi-professional football in the Czech Republic for Motorlet Prague. On his return to the Bahamas he worked as a real estate agent and now as a broker at C.A. Christie & Co.

International career
He made his international debut for Bahamas in a March 2000 FIFA World Cup qualification match against Anguilla and had earned a total of 14 caps, scoring no goals. He has represented his country in 8 FIFA World Cup qualification matches.

References

External links

 Business profile - CA Christie

1981 births
Living people
Sportspeople from Nassau, Bahamas
Association football central defenders
Bahamian footballers
Bahamas international footballers
Bahamian expatriate footballers
Bahamian expatriate sportspeople in the United States
Expatriate soccer players in the United States
Expatriate footballers in the Czech Republic
Cavalier FC players
BFA Senior League players
Bahamian expatriate sportspeople in the Czech Republic